Hannah Green (born 20 December 1996) is an Australian professional golfer and winner of the 2019 Women's PGA Championship.

Early life 
Green was born in Perth, Western Australia.

Education 
Green attended Como Secondary College and was in the golf academy at the school.

Career 
Green turned professional in 2016. She plays on the LPGA Tour and ALPG Tour. 

Green has two pro-am wins on the ALPG Tour. She played on the Symetra Tour in 2017, winning three times, finishing second on the money list and won the Rookie of the Year award. She earned her 2018 LPGA Tour card as a result.

In June 2019, Green won her first major (and first LPGA Tour event), the Women's PGA Championship, by one stroke over defending champion Park Sung-hyun. It was the first wire-to-wire win at the Women's PGA Championship since Yani Tseng in 2011 and the first major win by an Australian since Karrie Webb at the 2006 Kraft Nabisco Championship. In winning the event, Green also became only the third Australian woman to win a major, after Webb and Jan Stephenson.

Before her maiden victory on the LPGA Tour, Green's best finish was third place at the 2018 ISPS Handa Women's Australian Open. and her best major finish was a tied for 16th at the 2018 ANA Inspiration.

On 1 September 2019, Green won her second LPGA Tour event at the Cambia Portland Classic, while in December 2019 she was awarded the Greg Norman Medal. In February 2020, she was jointly awarded the 2019 Western Australian Sports Star of the Year with Australian rules football star, Nat Fyfe.

On 4–7 August 2021, Green represented Australia in women's individual golf event at the 2020 Olympic Games in Tokyo together with Minjee Lee. She scored −13 across the four rounds and finished fifth

Green is the ambassador for the Como Golf academy.

Amateur wins
2012 Newman and Brooks Junior Championship
2013 WA 72 Hole Stroke Play
2014 Dunes Medal
2015 Port Phillip Open Amateur & Victorian Women's Amateur Championship

Source:

Professional wins (9)

LPGA Tour wins (2)

Symetra Tour wins (3)
2017 Sara Bay Classic, Murphy USA El Dorado Shootout, IOA Golf Classic

ALPG Tour wins (4)
2017 Pennant Hills Pro Am, Hope Island Pro Am (tie with Rebecca Artis)
2022 Vic Open, TPS Murray River

Major championships

Wins (1)

Results timeline
Results not in chronological order before 2019 or in 2020.

CUT = missed the half-way cut
NT = no tournament
T = tied

Summary

 Most consecutive cuts made – 10 (2019 U.S. Open – 2021 U.S. Open)
 Longest streak of top 10s – 1 (three times)

Team appearances
Amateur
Patsy Hankins Trophy (representing Asia/Pacific): 2016 (winners)
Espirito Santo Trophy (representing Australia): 2016
Astor Trophy (representing Australia): 2015 (winners)
Tasman Cup (representing Australia): 2012 (winners)
Queen Sirikit Cup (representing Australia): 2014, 2015, 2016

Professional
The Queens (representing ALPG): 2017

Recognition
2019 – Australian Women's Health Sport Awards Outstanding Woman in Sport.

 2020 - Western Australian Sports Star of the Year (joint with Nat Fyfe)

References

External links

Australian female golfers
LPGA Tour golfers
ALPG Tour golfers
Winners of LPGA major golf championships
Olympic golfers of Australia
Golfers at the 2020 Summer Olympics
Golfers from Perth, Western Australia
1996 births
Living people